Frederick Homes Dudden (1874–1955) was an academic administrator and theological scholar. He was Chaplain to King George V and George VI (1929–52), Master of Pembroke College, Oxford (1918–55) and Vice-Chancellor of Oxford University (1929–32).

Education and career
Frederick Dudden was educated at Bath College and Pembroke College, Oxford. Dudden was Vicar of Holy Trinity Church in Sloane Street, central London. He was Fellow, Lecturer in Theology and Chaplain of Lincoln College, Oxford (1898–1914). He was Canon of Gloucester (1918–37). At Oxford University, he was a member of Hebdomadal Council (1924–45) and Pro-Vice-Chancellor (1925–29 and 1932–49), before and after his time as Vice-Chancellor.

Pembroke College
At Pembroke College, he was the first Master to live in the Lodgings. The previous Master's House was converted into undergraduate accommodation in 1928. He was a friend of Lord Nuffield, which led to the endowment of the Pembroke Mastership. This freed subsequent Masters of Pembroke from the financial need to take the position of Canon at Gloucester Cathedral, which had been given to the college by Queen Anne in 1714. As a representative of Pembroke College he was on the governing body of Abingdon School from 1921 to 1949.

Publications
Henry Fielding: His Life, Works, and Times (2 vols), 1953
Gregory the Great, his Place in History and Thought (2 vols)
The Life and Times of St Ambrose (2 vols)
Christ and Christ's Religion
In Christ's Name
The Future Life
The Problem of Human Suffering and the War
The Heroic Dead and other Sermons
The Delayed Victory
The Dead and the Living, and other Sermons

References

External links

 Pictures from the National Portrait Gallery (London)
 Books from Alibris

1874 births
1955 deaths
Alumni of Pembroke College, Oxford
British chaplains
Anglican chaplains
20th-century English Anglican priests
English theologians
Fellows of Lincoln College, Oxford
Masters of Pembroke College, Oxford
Pro-Vice-Chancellors of the University of Oxford
Vice-Chancellors of the University of Oxford
Governors of Abingdon School